Tabanus nigrescens is a species of horse fly in the family Tabanidae.

Distribution
United States.

Subspecies
These two subspecies belong to the species Tabanus nigrescens:
 Tabanus nigrescens atripennis Stone, 1935
 Tabanus nigrescens nigrescens Palisot de Beauvois, 1809

References

Tabanidae
Insects described in 1809
Taxa named by Palisot de Beauvois
Diptera of North America